Astronomy Today was a Canadian science television series which aired on CBC Television in 1959.

Premise
F. A. Kaempffer, a University of British Columbia physics professor, presented various lectures during this series which concerned modern scientific theories and how these relate to historical theories. These were accompanied with photographs and graphics from the Dominion Astrophysical Observatory.

Production
Gene Lawrence produced Astronomy Today in Vancouver.

Scheduling
The half-hour series aired Sundays at 3:30 p.m. (Eastern) from 24 May to 16 August 1959.

References

External links
 

CBC Television original programming
1959 Canadian television series debuts
1959 Canadian television series endings
Astronomy education television series
Black-and-white Canadian television shows
Television shows filmed in Vancouver